Captain Amarinder Singh's second cabinet started from March 2017. Amarinder Singh is the leader of INC was sworn in the Chief Ministers of Punjab on 16 March 2017. His ministry had 17 Cabinet ministers including the Chief Minister as well as two women. The following is the list of ministers with their portfolios in the Government of Punjab.

Captain Amarinder Singh resigned from the post of Chief Ministers of Punjab after claiming that he felt humiliated three times by the Congress leadership in the past two months.

Tenure
In June 2021, MLA and deputy leader of the opposition in Punjab assembly, Saravjit Kaur Manuke held hunger strike along with AAP activists to protest against the inaction of the Punjab government in the payment of post-matric scholarship amount of Dalit students. AAP convener Bhagwant Mann said that the protest by AAP members had forced the Punjab government then led by CM Amarinder Singh to release the funds amounting to 200 crore as 40% share of the amount that Punjab government had to pay.

Council of Ministers

Former Ministers

Major decisions

Reducing the number of the post of Patwari
On 5 December 2019, the Council of Ministers in the Amarinder Singh government took a decision to reduce the number of posts of patwari in the revenue department from 4,716 to 3,660. The decision was not publicly disclosed.

See also 

 Government of Punjab, India
 Punjab Legislative Assembly
 Charanjit Singh Channi ministry

References

Indian National Congress state ministries
2017 in India
2017 in Indian politics
Punjab, India ministries
State cabinet ministers of Punjab, India
Cabinets established in 2017
2017 establishments in Punjab, India